Fochville is a farming and mining town located in the Gauteng province of South Africa. It is part of the Merafong City Local Municipality, which also includes Kokosi, Carletonville and Khutsong.
The area surrounding Fochville contains Sotho or Tswana ruins. Tlokwe Ruins are the remains of Sotho-Tswana settlements on the hills surrounding Fochville that were inhabited until the 1820s. Boer War hero Danie Theron was killed 5 km north of the town. The town itself was established as an agricultural centre in 1920 and was named after the World War I commander-in-chief of the Allied forces in France, Marshal of France Ferdinand Foch.

Education 
Fochville has two primary schools and one high school.

Culture 
Sports, including cricket, rugby, squash, yoga, and kickboxing are typically played at the Gert van Rensburg Stadium. The town is also home to a bird farm and a trout hatchery.

Attack 
In September 2012, the settlements near Fochville were subject to an ethnically motivated attack. Shacks were razed. Four people were killed and another six injured. The attack took place  following a dispute over boundaries between two rival factions. The attackers used knobkierries, petrol cans and traditional spears and daggers.

Tourist attractions
In early mining days, Western Deep Levels struck a stream of sulphurous water, which to this day surges out of the borehole.

Renosterfontein is a farm with old Tswana kraals, a traditional African village and the ruins of a house that belonged to the brothers of President Andries Pretorius.

The Tlokwe Ruins are the remains of Sotho-Tswana settlements on the hills surrounding Fochville. They were used until the inhabitants were driven away by Mzilikazi in the 1820s.

Monuments can be found in the area of Fochville. The Voortrekker Plaque, located to the south west, marks the site of an early Voortrekker fortification of 1842. The Theron Memorial is a memorial to Boer scout Danie Theron who was killed in 1900 during an engagement with a British detachment.

References

External links
 

Populated places in the Merafong City Local Municipality
Mining communities in South Africa